Adna Romulus Johnson (December 14, 1860 – June 11, 1938) was a teacher, lawyer, and U.S. Representative from Ohio for one term from 1909 to 1911.

Biography 
Born in Sweet Springs, Missouri, Johnson moved with his mother to a farm in Lawrence County, Ohio, in 1864, where attended the common schools. He taught school seven years and then studied law. He was admitted to the bar in 1886.

Johnson graduated from the University of Michigan Law School at Ann Arbor in 1887 and practiced his profession in Ironton, Ohio. He served as the prosecuting attorney of Lawrence County in 1889.

Johnson was elected as a Republican to the Sixty-first Congress (March 4, 1909–March 3, 1911). He was renominated without opposition in 1910, but declined to accept. He resumed the practice of law in Ironton. He also engaged in banking and was financially interested in various manufacturing concerns. Johnson served as president of the Ohio State Bar Association in 1933.

Death
He died in Ironton on June 11, 1938, and was interred in Woodland Cemetery.

Sources
 

1860 births
1938 deaths
University of Michigan Law School alumni
People from Sweet Springs, Missouri
People from Lawrence County, Ohio
Ohio lawyers
County district attorneys in Ohio
People from Ironton, Ohio
Republican Party members of the United States House of Representatives from Ohio